Southport is a town and archipelago in Lincoln County, Maine, United States. The population was 622 at the 2020 census. It includes the villages of Capitol Island, Hendricks Harbor, Newagen, Pine Cliff, Squirrel Island, and West Southport. The majority of the town's residents live on its main island, Southport Island.

History
The Abenaki people that originally inhabited the island called it Capanewagen. Cape Newagen, an English corruption of the Abenaki name, was the name of an early English fishing outpost at the southern tip of the island. The island would later be known as Newagen Island by Europeans.

While the first European settlement was established in 1623, the island was abandoned by the English when they were driven from the region by the Abenaki during King Phillip's War in 1676. After the war, colonists returned to the island, only to be driven out again during King William's War in 1689.

After 40 years, colonists again returned to the region in 1730. In 1764, Townsend, named after Lord Townshend, was officially incorporated. The name of the town was changed to Boothbay in 1842, and Southport split from Boothbay the same year, becoming incorporated as a town on February 12, 1842.

Geography
Southport is on Southport Island in the mouth of the Sheepscot River. The islands of Southport include the Ark, Boston Island, Burnt Island, Cape Island, Capitol Island, Squirrel Island, Cedarbush Island, the Cuckolds, David Island, the Green Islands, Hunting Island, Lower Mark Island, Mouse Island, Pratts Island, Southport Island, and Squirrel Island.

The main island is crossed by state routes 27 and 238. Southport Island is connected by a green swing bridge to the adjacent town of Boothbay Harbor.

Demographics

2010 census
As of the census of 2010, there were 606 people, 316 households, and 195 families living in the town. The racial makeup of the town was 96.5% White, 1.7% from two or more races,  1.3% Asian, 0.3% African American and 0.2% Native American. Hispanic and/or Latino of any race were 0.2% of the population.

There were 316 households, of which 14.2% had children under the age of 18 living with them, 55.1% were married couples living together, 4.7% had a female householder with no husband present, 1.9% had a male householder with no wife present, and 38.3% were non-families. 33.2% of all households were made up of individuals, and 18.4% had someone living alone who was 65 years of age or older. The average household size was 1.92 and the average family size was 2.38.

The median age in the town was 60.1 years. 12% of residents were under the age of 18; 2.3% were between the ages of 18 and 24; 13% were from 25 to 44; 35.6% were from 45 to 64; and 37% were 65 years of age or older. The gender makeup of the town was 48.5% male and 51.5% female.

2000 census
As of the census of 2000, there were 684 people, 331 households, and 218 families living in the town. The racial makeup of the town was 98.83% White, 0.58% Asian, and 0.58% from two or more races.

There were 331 households, out of which 19.9% had children under the age of 18 living with them, 59.8% were married couples living together, 3.3% had a female householder with no husband present, and 34.1% were non-families. 29.9% of all households were made up of individuals, and 14.5% had someone living alone who was 65 years of age or older.  The average household size was 2.07 and the average family size was 2.52.

In the town, the population was spread out, with 14.6% under the age of 18, 3.5% from 18 to 24, 15.4% from 25 to 44, 35.7% from 45 to 64, and 30.8% who were 65 years of age or older.  The median age was 53 years. For every 100 females, there were 95.4 males.  For every 100 females age 18 and over, there were 97.3 males.

The median income for a household in the town was $38,125, and the median income for a family was $52,750. Males had a median income of $35,500 versus $24,583 for females. The per capita income for the town was $33,481.  About 4.2% of families and 6.8% of the population were below the poverty line, including 11.2% of those under age 18 and 3.3% of those age 65 or over.

Sites of interest
 Burnt Island Light
 The Cuckolds Light
 Hendricks Head Light
 Squirrel Island

Notable people 

 Ralph H. Cameron, U.S. senator from Arizona
 Rachel Carson, marine biologist and conservationist
 Margaret Hamilton, film actress
 Wilder Hobson, journalist
 Hart Day Leavitt, educator and editor
 Gustaf Tenggren, illustrator
 Claggett Wilson, painter

References

Further reading

  Francis Byron Greene, History of Boothbay, Southport and Boothbay Harbor, Maine 1623–1905; Portland, Maine 1906

External links
 Town of Southport, Maine
 Southport Memorial Library
 Boothbay Register newspaper
 Boothbay Region Historical Society
 Epodunk profile
Maine Genealogy: Southport, Lincoln County, Maine

Towns in Lincoln County, Maine
Towns in Maine
Populated coastal places in Maine